This is a round-up of the 1994 Sligo Senior Football Championship. Tourlestrane were champions for the first time in twelve years, after defeating Shamrock Gaels in the final. This was the last year that amalgamations competed in the Championship, St. Nathy's and Geevagh/St. Michael's exiting early, though Bunninadden's promotion to Senior level meant the end of the former alliance in any event. Ballymote returned to the Championship after a 27-year gap, but didn't enjoy much success.

First round

Quarter finals

Semi-finals

Sligo Senior Football Championship Final

References

 Sligo Champion (July–September 1994)

Sligo Senior Football Championship
Sligo Senior Football Championship